Narendra Kumar Patni (9 March 1942 – 3 June 2014) was an entrepreneur and IT visionary who founded Patni Computer Systems and helped establish the overall Indian IT industry.
He is considered a "pioneer of India's information technology (IT) services revolution" and a "doyen of the industry" Patni was listed in the Forbes list of India's 40 Richest in 2005.

Patni was the founder and CEO of Patni Computer Systems, (PTI, PATNI) with headquarters in Kendall Square, Cambridge and Mumbai, India. Patni Computer Systems employed 18,000 people around the world and was listed on the Bombay and New York Stock Exchanges.

Narendra Patni graduated in Electrical Engineering from the Indian Institute of Technology, Roorkee and had a master's degree in Electrical Engineering from Massachusetts Institute of Technology. He also held an MBA from the MIT Sloan School of Management.  Patni divided his time between Mumbai, India and Boston, MA.

He died on 3 June 2014 in Boston, MA.

Early life and education

Patni was born in 1942 in Delhi, India to a Jain Business family.  He attended the University of Roorkee (presently known as the Indian Institute of Technology (IIT), Roorkee) and graduated with a Bachelors in Electrical Engineering in 1964.

He then received a fellowship from the Grass Foundation  to study at the Massachusetts Institute of Technology in Cambridge, MA, arriving in the US in 1964—the year before the Immigration and Naturalisation Act of 1965 started Indian emigration to the US in earnest. Patni obtained a Masters in Electrical Engineering at the Massachusetts Institute of Technology (SM 1966) and an SM from the Sloan School of Management (SM 1969).

Career

At MIT Patni met Jay W. Forrester, inventor of magnetic core memory, who became his lifelong mentor. After graduating from MIT Patni joined Forrester Consulting Group, which applied "systems analysis approach to complex corporate systems" 

In 1972, Patni was president of Forrester Consulting Group, which advised companies and government agencies on technology issues. It was at this time that Patni and his wife Poonam began to conceptualise and test the idea of "offshoring" technology services.

The site of their initial tests, Patni's residence at 10 St Paul Street, Cambridge, "could qualify as a historic landmark" as this is where Narendra and Poonam experimented with converting data from paper documents to computer databases without relying on any oral communications.  Patni was convinced of the economic impact that this business model could have and set up Data Conversion, Inc, in October 1972.

Poonam Patni based herself in Pune, India and set up a team of about 20 programmers who entered data into Flexowriter machines for early clients, who included Lexis Nexis, the American Film Institute, and the American Mathematical Society.  The paper tape was then converted into magnetic tape and entered into a computer. "At one point of time, DCI was typesetting almost half of the journals published in north-east USA."  Initially, the paper tape was produced in India and shipped back to the US. A more efficient method was to avoid the paper tape and enter the data directly into computers, on magnetic media.

Patni Computer Systems was founded in 1976.  This marked the beginning of an evolution in Patni's model from offshore data conversion services to software development services. Initial clients were Data General, Raheja Constructions, and ACC.  Patni Computers also became a distributor and later licensed manufacturer of Data General computers.

In 1977, Patni appointed NR Narayana Murthy to head the software division, who eventually left Patni Computers in 1980 along with six colleagues and went on to found Infosys.

In 1999, Patni Computer Systems was restructured as a "pure software operation"  It became a "separate entity from PCS Industries Limited". In 2001 the software (PATNI) and hardware (PCS Technologies) divisions were separated entirely in branding as well.  With the Patni Computer Systems, the software company, being branded as PATNI.

General Atlantic Partners, a leading global private equity company, invested $100 million in Patni Computer Systems in 2002. It was "one of the most substantial investments made in any Indian software company by an international private investment group and [was] the largest made by General Atlantic in Asia."

Patni Computers listed on the Bombay Stock Exchange (BSE) and National Stock Exchange of India  in January 2004.  It issued ADRs on the NYSE (ticker: PTI) in December 2005.

In 2011 software firm iGate acquired a majority stake in PCS for $1.2 billion. This deal was "the second-largest in the high technology sector in terms of deal value, after Oracle Corp's acquisition of majority stake in India's i-flex solutions for more than $1.5 billion, according to Thomson Reuters data." At the time of its acquisition, Patni Computer Systems was the sixth-largest software exporter in India.

Personal life

Patni was married for 42 years to Poonam Kapur, who was born in Lucknow, India and emigrated to the US in 1972. She divides her time between Boston and Mumbai. His son Anirudh (born 1976) is a graduate of the Massachusetts Institute of Technology and The Wharton School, University of Pennsylvania. Daughter Ambika (born 1979) is a graduate of Harvard University and the London Business School.

A lover of all kinds of music, ranging from Joan Baez to jazz to classical Hindi ghazals, Patni attended the Woodstock music festival in 1969. He served on the Board of Trustees and was a significant benefactor for Siddhachalam, a major Jain ashram complex and pilgrimage point in New Jersey.

Other

Patni founded the N.K. Patni Charitable Trust in India and the Patni Family Foundation in the US.  Both are active in supporting education and medicine. In 2016, the Patni Family Foundation was a significant funder of the SRCC Children's hospital in Mumbai, India—the largest such facility in Asia.

In 2008, the Indian Institute of Technology, Roorkee honoured Narendra Kumar Patni with the Distinguished Alumni Award for Corporate Development, Administration and Entrepreneurship.

He also received the Light of India Lifetime Achievement Award for Business Leadership in New York in 2012.

Narendra Patni died from complications relating to surgery on 3 June 2014.

References

MIT School of Engineering alumni
MIT Sloan School of Management alumni
1942 births
2014 deaths
20th-century Indian Jains
Indian chief executives